Mindell is a surname. Notable people with the surname include:

Arnold Mindell (born 1940), American psychotherapist,
Earl Mindell (born 1940), Canadian author and nutritionist
Fania Mindell (1894—1969), American feminist, activist and theater artist

M